Charles Wyatt may refer to:

 Charles Wyatt (architect) (1758–1819), English architect and member of parliament
 Charles Wyatt (writer), American musician and writer
 Charles William Wyatt, New Zealand solicitor and politician

See also